John Arndt may refer to:

 John Arndt (basketball) (1928–2021), American assistant (1960–1961) and head coach (1961–1968) of men's basketball at Loyola Marymount University 
 Johann Arndt (1555–1621), German Lutheran theologian
 John Penn Arndt (1780–1861), American merchant, pioneer, and legislator